Amir R. Korangy (born November 21, 1973) is an Iranian-American publisher and film producer, who founded the business magazine, The Real Deal, about real estate and finance news. He also produced the PBS documentary, "Building Stories", about architect Costas Kondylis. Amir Korangy is also an adjunct associate professor of media and real estate at New York University where in the fall of 2018 he will be teaching a course titled the Korangy sessions where graduate students will have an opportunity to court questions as to the reality of real estate in the city and the country, complementing to their theoretical framework.

Korangy was born in Tehran, Iran. After the Islamic Revolution of 1979 his family left Iran as political refugees and spent time in Paris and Madrid before settling in the Washington, D.C., area. Korangy received a BA in Journalism and Foreign Policy at Boston University and attended Emerson College.

Career 

After college, Korangy moved to Baja, Mexico where he commenced his career as a publisher. He started South of the Border, a weekly newspaper that targeted expatriates living in Baja. The paper was bought within the first year by the Gringo Gazette, another local newspaper. His next venture was the founding of The Washington Free Press, a weekly tabloid challenging DC's conservative media culture. The Washington Free Press was sold to the Washington City Paper in 1997.

After graduate studies at Emerson College, Korangy moved to New York City in 1999. He worked at Yahoo Inc., and eventually began investing in New York City real estate.  These transactions inspired Korangy to recognize a void in that industry for compelling real estate news.

In April 2003 Korangy put out the first edition of The Real Deal from his apartment in Prospect Heights, Brooklyn. The Real Deal provides an inside look into the prominent New York real estate market as well as reports national and international market trends.  There are also South Florida and Los Angeles editions of The Real Deal available online daily and in print quarterly. The monthly magazine includes an array of news exclusives, wide-ranging interviews, and in-depth analyses for brokers, developers, investors, appraisers, bankers, architects and real estate enthusiasts. The Real Deal has a monthly print readership of 132,000 and a monthly online audience of over 2.6 million visitors and 17 million impressions.

Each year Korangy hosts thousands of real estate professionals at The Real Deal Annual Forum held at Lincoln Center where he introduces and interviews industry luminaries. In September, 2015, Korangy hosted the largest Real Estate Development event in China as well as events in Toronto and South Florida.

In pursuing his interests in film and real estate, Korangy produced Building Stories, a feature documentary on the life of architect, Costas Kondylis, which aired on PBS in 2012.  The film features development moguls Donald Trump, Larry Silverstein, and Aby Rosen; founding editor of Dwell magazine, Karrie Jacobs; architecture critics and historians, James Gardner, Francis Morrone, and Kenneth Frampton; and Pritzker Prize-winning architect Richard Meier. In 2015, Korangy authored the book The Closing: Interviews with New York's Titans of Real Estate.

Korangy serves on the Board of Directors for SalesCrunch.

In the Media 
Through his work as publisher of The Real Deal, Korangy has been called upon as an industry expert and has been regularly quoted in publications including The New York Times and Forbes  and appeared on news programs on CNN, CNBC, FOX News. and Real Estate with Vince Rocco, VoiceAmerica™. Korangy also serves as a thought leader to the print and digital publishing sector by sitting on industry panels for conferences such as Inman Real Estate Connect.

Accolades 
Under Korangy's leadership, The Real Deal was named the best publication and real estate news website by the National Association of Real Estate Editors (NAREE) for 2010 and 2011. In 2012, Korangy was named Entrepreneur of the Year by the Young Jewish Professionals (YJP).  In 2009, he was presented with the Boy Scouts of America Explorer's Leadership Award for his work with underprivileged inner city kids. In 2009, Korangy was listed in The New York Observer's Power 100 list of the most powerful people in New York Real Estate. In 2013, Inman News named Korangy one of the 100 Most Influential Real Estate leaders in the Media category. In November 2014, Korangy was honored as a Child's Champion Award recipient by the Ronald McDonald House New York for his support of families of seriously ill children. Korangy was named as a juror in the prestigious A+Awards, presented by Architizer—a global online network for architecture. In October 2016, Korangy was honored with the Media Man of the Year Award by Vavardi Institute for Ovarian Cancer Education, for his support efforts benefiting Voice,, Mount Sinai and Ovarian Cancer Research Organization. The Real Deal Magazine just opened its offices in Chicago in April 2018 highlighting the success of the Real Deal and its attractiveness to big city venues.

Personal life 
Korangy resides in the Manhattan borough of New York City.  He is a collector and supporter of the arts.  Within 7 months in 2007, Korangy completed both the Paris and New York City marathons. Since then he has given up running.

References

External links 
 Amir Korangy on CNN In the Arena with Eliot Spitzer
 
 Freakonomics Quorum: Is It Time to Believe in the Housing Bubble?. Freakonomics  Blog.
 

American people of Iranian descent
1973 births
Iranian publishers (people)
American publishers (people)
Boston University alumni
Emerson College alumni
People from Tehran
Living people
People from Prospect Heights, Brooklyn